Cadence Recordings, formerly MapleMusic, is a Canadian independent record label founded by Andy Maize, Jeff Maize, Mike Alkier, Evan Hu, Lorique Mindel and Grant Dexter in 1999 and based in Toronto, Ontario. Other investors include Gary Slaight, Michael Burke and Universal Music. In 2016, its parent Company Maple Core changed its name to Cadence Music Group, and as a result, MapleMusic was renamed as Cadence Recordings.

History 
The MapleMusic Recordings label is a project of Andy Maize from Canadian roots rock band Skydiggers and Maple CEO Grant Dexter. Other artists who have released albums on MapleMusic include David Usher, Colin James, Boy, The Dears, Jason Bajada, Martha Wainwright, Pilot Speed (formerly known as Pilate), Gordon Downie, Joel Plaskett, Spirit of the West, Ridley Bent, Kinnie Starr, Cookie Duster and the Hugh Dillon Redemption Choir.

MapleMusic released three Radiohead albums In Rainbows, The King of Limbs and TKOL RMX 1234567 in Canada, along with ATO in the US and XL in the UK.

Two singer-songwriters, however, have been particularly responsible for MapleMusic Recordings's success: Sam Roberts, who was transformed from a struggling independent musician to a Canadian rock icon practically overnight by his 2001 MapleMusic Recordings debut, The Inhuman Condition, and Kathleen Edwards, whose album Failer made her a critical favourite in 2003.

MapleMusic Recordings' brick and mortar business is distributed and marketed in Canada by Universal Music Canada.

In 2015, Iain M.Taylor became CEO of MapleMusic.

In March 2016, the label announced it had changed its name to Cadence Recordings after MapleCore was renamed as Cadence Music Group.

Artists

Current

22-20s
 Alabama Shakes
 Alberta Cross
 Trey Anastasio
 Andrew Austin 
 Autolux
 Jason Bajada
 Danny Barnes
 Rayland Baxter
 Beady Eye
 The Bees
 Ridley Bent
 Bo Keeney
 Boots Electric
 The Bright Light Social Hour
 Brighter Brightest
 The Bronx
 Jim Bryson & The Weakerthans
 John Butler Trio
 Butter the Children
 Candy Coated Killahz
 Carl Broemel
 Don Brownrigg
 Caveman
 Chantal Kreviazuk
 Chet Faker
 Codeine Velvet Club
 Cold War Kids
 Cookie Duster
 Thomas D'Arcy
 Delphic
 The Dismemberment Plan
 Drive-By Truckers
 Eastern Conference Champions
 Kathleen Edwards
 Everest
 Fitz and the Tantrums
 Jonny Fritz
 Gomez
 Gogol Bordello
 GUS 
 Lisa Hannigan
 Hatcham Social
 The Henry Clay People
 Patterson Hood
 Houses
 J. Roddy Walston and the Business
 Jim James
 Sass Jordan
 Jovanotti
 Language Arts
 Daniel Lanois
 Bobby Long
 Lucero
 Vusi Mahlasela
 Mariachi El Bronx
 Miike Snow
 Minus the Bear
 Misstress Barbara
 The Most Serene Republic
 My Morning Jacket
 Nash
 Sierra Noble
 Neverending White Lights
 Okkervil River
 Old Crow Medicine Show
 Old Self & Kam Speech
 Organ Thieves
 Other Lives
 Ben Ottewell
 Doug Paisley
 Phish
 Pilot Speed (formerly Pilate)
 Joel Plaskett
 Port O'Brien
 Port St. Willow
 Primus
 Pure Bathing Culture
 Radiohead
 Kam Speech
 Rodrigo y Gabriela
 Caitlin Rose
 The River and The Road
 Royal Teeth
 Royal Wood
 Rusko
 San Fermin 
 Gordie Sampson
 Primal Scream
 Sea Wolf
 Silversun Pickups
 SOJA
 Theresa Sokyrka
 Stereophonics
 Allen Stone
 Thought Beneath Film
 Two Gallants
 Typhoon
 David Usher
 Butch Walker
 Martha Wainwright
 White Denim
 White Rabbits
 Widespread Panic
 Wildcat! Wildcat!
 Jonathan Wilson
 Andrew Wyatt

Former

311
 Ashes of Soma
 BOY
 Braided
 Brendan Benson
 Cowboy Junkies
 Crowded House
 Dala
 Dawes
 DJ Champion
 Mike Doughty
 Gordon Downie
 Peter Elkas
 Fiction Family Grady
 The Fireman
 David Gray
 Headstones
 Colin James
 Jem
 Carly Rae Jepsen
 Sass Jordan
 Kill the Lights
 Patrick Krief
 Ben Kweller
 Land of Talk
 The Latency
 The Lowest of the Low
 Massari
 Danny Michel
 Mike Ford
 The Miniatures
 Not by Choice
 Lesley Pike
 Jason Plumb
 Prozzak
 The Rankin Family
 Sam Roberts
 Spirit of the West
 Kinnie Starr
 Tegan and Sara
 Simon Wilcox
 The Whigs

Awards and accolades

Juno Awards
The Juno Awards are presented by the Canadian Academy of Recording Arts and Sciences.

|-
|  || Joel Plaskett Emergency Down at the Khyber || Alternative Album of the Year || 
|-
|  || Kathleen Edwards Failer || Roots and Traditional Album of the Year || 
|-
|rowspan="5"|  || Joel Plaskett Emergency Truthfully Truthfully || Alternative Album of the Year || 
|-
|| Kathleen Edwards || Songwriter of the Year || 
|-
|| The Dears || New Group of the Year || 
|-
|| Kinnie Starr || New Artist of the Year || 
|-
|| Danny Michel || New Artist of the Year || 
|-
|  || Gordie Sampson || Songwriter of the Year || 
|-
|rowspan="5"|  || Theresa Sokyrka These Old Charms || Pop Album of the Year || 
|-
|| Kathleen Edwards Back To Me || Adult Alternative Album of the Year || 
|-
|| Kathleen Edwards || Songwriter of the Year || 
|-
|| Joel Plaskett || Songwriter of the Year || 
|-
|| Martha Wainwright || New Artist of the Year || 
|-
|rowspan="2"|  || Gordie Sampson || Songwriter of the Year || 
|-
|| Neverending White Lights || New Artist of the Year || 
|-
|  || Joel Plaskett || Songwriter of the Year || 
|-
|rowspan="3"|  || David Usher Wake Up and Say Goodbye || Pop Album of the Year || 
|-
|| Kathleen Edwards, Asking for Flowers || Adult Alternative Album of the Year || 
|-
|| Gordie Sampson || Songwriter of the Year || 
|-
|rowspan="4"|  || Joel Plaskett Three || Adult Alternative Album of the Year || 
|-
|| Joel Plaskett || Songwriter of the Year || 
|-
|| Carly Rae Jepsen & Ryan Stewart || Songwriter of the Year || 
|-
|| Carly Rae Jepsen || New Artist of the Year || 
|-
|  || Royal Wood || Songwriter of the Year || 
|-
|rowspan="3"|  || Kathleen Edwards || Songwriter of the Year || 
|-
|| Kathleen Edwards Voyageur || Adult Alternative Album of the Year || 
|-
|| Royal Wood, We Were Born to Glory || Adult Alternative Album of the Year || 
|-

Polaris Music Prize
The Polaris Music Prize is an award given to the best Canadian full-length album based solely on artistic merit.

|-
|rowspan="2"|  || Joel Plaskett Ashtray Rock || Polaris Music Prize Short List || 
|-
|| The Dears Gang of Losers || Polaris Music Prize Short List || 
|-
|  || Kathleen Edwards Asking For Flowers || Polaris Music Prize Short List || 
|-
|rowspan="2"|  || Joel Plaskett Three || Polaris Music Prize Short List || 
|-
|| Martha Wainwright I Know You're Married But I've Got Feelings Too || Polaris Music Prize Long List || 
|-
|rowspan="2"|  || Kathleen Edwards Voyageur || Polaris Music Prize Short List || 
|-
|| Joel Plaskett Emergency Scrappy Happiness || Polaris Music Prize Long List || 
|-

See also
 List of record labels
 Music of Canada

References

External links
 MapleMusic Recordings, the record label
 MapleMusic.com, the e-commerce portal

 
Canadian independent record labels
Online retailers of Canada
Record labels established in 2001
Rock record labels
Music retailers of Canada
Canadian music websites